Yelyzaveta Bochkaryova, also written as Elizaveta Bochkaryova, (born May 5, 1978 in Lviv) is a Ukrainian track cyclist. At the 2012 Summer Olympics, she competed in the Women's team pursuit for the national team.

Career highlights
2008
2nd Team Pursuit, 2008 UCI Track Cycling World Championships

External links 
 Profile at Sports-Reference.com

Ukrainian female cyclists
1978 births
Sportspeople from Lviv
Living people
Olympic cyclists of Ukraine
Cyclists at the 2012 Summer Olympics
Ukrainian track cyclists